The Oregon State Beavers football team competes in the National Collegiate Athletic Association (NCAA) Division I Football Bowl Subdivision, representing the Oregon State University.

Seasons

Notes

References

Oregon State Beavers

Oregon State Beavers football seasons